John McEnroe and Jonas Björkman won in the final 7–6(7–2), 4–6, 10–7, against Paul Goldstein and Jim Thomas.

Seeds

  Simon Aspelin /  Todd Perry (semifinals)
  Wayne Arthurs /  Stephen Huss (first round)
  Jordan Kerr /  Travis Parrott (quarterfinals)
  Jaroslav Levinský  / Robert Lindstedt (semifinals)

Draw

Draw

External links
Draw

Doubles

pl:SAP Open 2006#Gra podwójna